Wayne Matle (born 21 January 1988 in Daveyton) is a South African association football defender. He last played for the Premier Soccer League club Maritzburg United.

References

1988 births
Living people
People from Daveyton
South African soccer players
Association football defenders
Kaizer Chiefs F.C. players
Maritzburg United F.C. players
Sportspeople from Gauteng